Lipase inhibitors are substances used to reduce the activity of lipases found in the intestine. Lipases are secreted by the pancreas when fat is present. The primary role of lipase inhibitors is to decrease the gastrointestinal absorption of fats. Fats then tend to be excreted in feces rather than being absorbed to be used as a source of caloric energy, and this can result in weight loss in individuals. These inhibitors could be used for the treatment of obesity, which can subsequently lead to Type 2 diabetes and cardiovascular diseases if not managed. An example of a lipase inhibitor is orlistat.

Mechanism

Lipase inhibitors may affect the amount of fat absorbed, yet they do not block the absorption of a particular type of fat. Likewise, lipase inhibitors are not absorbed into the bloodstream. Lipase inhibitors bind to lipase enzymes in the intestine, thus preventing the hydrolysis of dietary triglycerides into monoglycerides and fatty acids. This then reduces the absorption of dietary fat. Lipase inhibitors covalently bond to the active serine site on lipases. This covalent bond is strong, meaning the lipase inhibitor tends to remain attached to the lipase.  Studies have shown that lipase inhibitors work optimally when 40% of an individual's daily caloric intake is obtained from fat. Orlistat tends to block absorption of 30% of total fat intake from a meal, as orlistat passes out of the digestive tract more rapidly than fat does.

Sources

Lipase inhibitors can be found naturally in plants and can also be produced as pharmaceutical drugs.  Some lipase inhibitors have been identified in Panax ginseng. Some active compounds with chalcone scaffold found in Glycyrrhiza glabra, Cassia mimosoides, Glycyrrhiza uralensis, Boesenbergia rotunda, apples and Morus alba also had strong effect against lipase. Caffeine, theobromine and theophylline were also supposed as lipase inhibitors although they are still controversial.

Side effects

Lipase inhibitors can cause side effects, including oily spotting, fecal incontinence, flatus with discharge  and abdominal cramping. Additionally, a raise in blood pressure, dry mouth, constipation, headache, and insomnia have been reported.  Malabsorption of fat soluble vitamins may develop as a result of the impaired absorption of fat, which is required for the transportation of these vitamins across the intestine to reach the blood. Since lipase inhibitors are not absorbed in the intestine, and consequently not circulating in the blood, information about alternative side effects such as the modulation of the gastrointestinal tract is unobtainable. Generally, side effects can be controlled by reducing the consumption of dietary fats. Overall, orlistat has been considered to be safer than other anti-obesity drugs.

Cautions and Considerations 
Because Lipase inhibitors interferes with the absorption of fat, it can also prevent the absorption of fat-soluble vitamins. It is recommended that multi-vitamins are taken along with Lipase inhibitors, so vitamin-deficiency doesn't occur.

See also
 Discovery and development of gastrointestinal lipase inhibitors

References

 
Obesity